Wāng (汪) is a Chinese surname. It was 104th of the Hundred Family Surnames poem, contained in the verse Yáo, Shào, Zhàn, Wāng (姚邵湛汪). In 2013, the Fuxi Cultural Association found the name to be the 60th most common in China, being shared by around 48.3 million people or 0.360% of the population, with the province with the largest population being Anhui. Another study found it to be the 58th-most-common surname in mainland China.

It is also Wong in Cantonese, Ong or Ang in Hokkien, Waung or Vong in American English, and Ō or Oh in Japanese. However, in Vietnamese, it is written Uông.
Wāng was listed by the NCIIS survey as the 58th most common surname in mainland China and by Yang Xuxian as the 76th most common surname on Taiwan.

Origins of Wāng
 means "vast" in the Chinese language, and is often used to describe oceans. In the modern vernacular Chinese, it is also the onomatopoeia for the sound of a barking dog. Baxter and Sagart reconstructed it as *qʷˤaŋ and 'wang, respectively.

 It was originally a shortening of Wang Mang (汪芒), or Wang Wang (汪罔), name of a state in present-day Deqing County, Zhejiang. After it was conquered by a neighboring state, its inhabitants fled and the surname was shortened to Wang (汪).
 The name is derived from the ancestral surname (Jiang (surname 姜).

Chinese Muslims
Unlike other Hui people who claim foreign descent, Hui in Gansu with the surname Wāng are descended from Han Chinese who converted to Islam and married Hui or Dongxiang people.

A town called Tangwangchuan in Gansu had a multi-ethnic populace, the Tang and Wāng families predominating. The Tang and Wang families were originally of non-Muslim Han extraction, but by the Twentieth Century some branches of the families had become Muslim by intermarriage or conversion.

Notable people
 Wang Jingwei (汪精衞) former Kuomintang officer and later Japanese collaborator
 Wang Daohan (汪道涵, 1915–2005), Chinese diplomat and co-negotiator of the 1992 Consensus 
 John Clang (born Ang Choon Leng,  汪春龙) - American-based Singaporean artist
 Jiro Wang (汪東城 born 1981) is a Taiwanese singer and actor
 Wang Feng (汪峰; born 1971) is a Chinese rock musician and composer
 Wang Yang (汪洋; born 1955) is a Chinese politician. He is a member of the Politburo Standing Committee
 Frank Wang (汪滔; Wāng Tāo; born 1980), a Chinese engineer, entrepreneur and the founder and CEO of DJI
 Wang Tao (archaeologist) (汪涛 born 1962), Chinese–British archaeologist and art historian specialising in early Chinese art
 Helen Kay Wang (née Below; 汪海岚; born 1965) an English sinologist and translator
 Wang Tao (汪涛), Chinese economist
 Chloe Bennet, born Chloe Wang (汪可盈; 1992), an American actress and singer
 Wang Han (Chinese: 汪涵; pinyin: Wāng Hán; born 1974), is a Chinese television variety show host
 Liza Wang Ming-chuen SBS (汪明荃, born 1947), is a diva, actress and MC from Hong Kong
 Cecilia Wang Shi Shi (汪詩詩, born 1981), also known as Cissy Wang, is a Hong Kong model
 Wang Dongxing (Chinese: 汪东兴; Wade–Giles: Wang Tung-hsing; 9 January 1916 – 21 August 2015) was a Chinese military commander and politician
 Irene Wang Yuen Yuen (汪圓圓, born 1986) is a Hong Kong model and actress
 Wang Hui (intellectual), (汪晖; born 1959) is a professor in the Department of Chinese Language and Literature, Tsinghua University
 Xu Yulan (born Wang Yulan, 汪玉蘭, 1921 – 2017) a Yue opera singer-actress who plays Sheng roles (all male characters)
 Wang Fang (汪芳; born 11 May 1955), better known by her pen name Fang Fang, a Chinese author
 Wang Qiang (footballer) (born 1984) is a Chinese international footballer as a defender
 Silence Wang (汪蘇瀧; born 1989) a Chinese pop singer and songwriter.
 Wang Song (汪嵩; born 1983) a Chinese footballer who currently plays for Jiangsu Suning in the Chinese Super League
 Wang You (Chinese: 汪猷; 1910 – 1997), also known as Yu Wang, was a Chinese biochemist. He was a pioneer of antibiotics and
 Wang Weifan (汪維藩; born 1927-2015) was an evangelical Christian leader of the state-sanctioned
Wang Haijian (Chinese: 汪海健; born 2000) is a Chinese footballer currently playing as a midfielder for Shanghai Shenhua. Wang
 Wang Jiajie (Chinese: 汪佳捷; born 1988 in Shanghai) is a Chinese football player who currently plays for China League Two
 Wang Dazhi (Chinese: 汪达之; Pinyin: Wāng Dázhī; 1903 – 1980) was a Chinese educator. Wang Dazhi was born in Yi County, Anhui
 Wang Xiaofeng (汪嘯風; born 1944) is a retired Chinese politician. 
 Wang Jinxian (Chinese: 汪晋贤; born 1996) is a Chinese footballer who currently plays for Dalian Yifang in the Chinese Super

References

Individual Chinese surnames